Phillips County is the name of several counties in the United States:

 Phillips County, Arkansas 
 Phillips County, Colorado 
 Phillips County, Kansas 
 Phillips County, Montana

See also 
 Phillip County, New South Wales, Australia
 Phillips (disambiguation)

fr:Phillips#Toponyme